The following is a list of notable augmented reality software including programs for application development, content management, gaming and integrated AR solutions. For a list specifically for AR video games, see List of augmented reality video games.

Proprietary

Open source

Other
 Fyuse
 VSight Remote

References

augmented reality software
Augmented reality
Mixed reality